Malignant: How Bad Policy and Bad Evidence Harm People with Cancer is a nonfiction book by Vinay Prasad, published in 2020 by Johns Hopkins University Press.

Content 
The book delves into cancer policy, oncological drug regulation, and clinical trial design, examining how many marginal and unproven cancer therapies are pushed to market on the basis of hype and bias.

Reviews 
According to Benjamin Chin Yee, who wrote an in-depth review of Malignant, states "Prasad does not shy away from controversy, and lays out his argument in lucid, readable prose." Tahla Burki writes in the Lancet Haematology, "Prasad outlines how the US Food and Drug Administration (FDA) approves cancer therapies on the basis of arbitrarily assigned surrogate endpoints that typically have no bearing on overall survival or quality of life. He examines how a complex web of conflicts-of-interests pollutes policy debates and expert recommendations, and how studies ask irrelevant questions in unrepresentative patient populations." Prasad has appeared on many podcasts to discuss Malignant, such as EconTalk with Russ Roberts and Oncology Overdrive with Shikha Jain. These discussions examine the current state of cancer policy and the ways in which physicians and patients can benefit from appropriate solutions.

References 

2020 non-fiction books
Johns Hopkins University Press books
Books about cancer